Special Explosion is an American rock band from Seattle, Washington.

History
Special Explosion began in 2012 with the release of their first EP. In 2014, Special Explosion released their second EP titled The Art of Mothering on Topshelf Records. In December 2017, Special Explosion released their debut full-length album, To Infinity, on Topshelf Records. The album received a 7.5 out of 10 rating from Pitchfork.

References

Musical groups from Seattle
Topshelf Records artists